Vimochanasamaram is a 1971 Indian Malayalam film, directed by Mohan Gandhiraman. The film stars Sathyan, Sheela, Maya and T. R. Omana in the lead roles. The film had musical score by M. B. Sreenivasan.

Cast
Sathyan
Sheela
Maya
T. R. Omana
Bahadoor
G. K. Pillai
Kaduvakulam Antony
N. Govindankutty
Ravichandran
T. K. Balachandran

Soundtrack
The music was composed by M. B. Sreenivasan and the lyrics were written by P. Bhaskaran, Vayalar Ramavarma, P. N. Dev and Mankombu Gopalakrishnan.

References

External links
 

1971 films
1970s Malayalam-language films
Films scored by M. B. Sreenivasan